The 1989 Head Cup, also known as the 1989 Austrian Open Kitzbühel, was a men's tennis tournament played on outdoor clay courts that was part of the 1989 Nabisco Grand Prix. It was the 19th edition of the tournament and took place at the Tennis stadium Kitzbühel in Kitzbühel, Austria, from 31 July until 6 August 1989. Third-seeded Emilio Sánchez won the singles title.

Finals

Singles
 Emilio Sánchez defeated  Martín Jaite, 7–6, 6–1, 2–6, 6–2
 It was Sánchez' only singles title of the year and the 9th of his career.

Doubles
 Sergio Casal /  Emilio Sánchez defeated  Petr Korda /  Tomáš Šmíd, 7–5, 7–6

References

External links
 ITF tournament edition details

Austrian Open
Austrian Open Kitzbühel
Austrian Open